Christmas is the seventh country studio album by The Oak Ridge Boys, released in 1982. It is a holiday / Christmas album released via MCA Records. The album produced one single in "Thank God for Kids", which made number three on the Hot Country Songs charts.

Track listing
"Jesus Is Born Today (It Is His Birthday)"
"Christmas Is Paintin' the Town"
"Christmas Carol"
"Silver Bells"
"Santa's Song"
"White Christmas"
"Happy Christmas Eve"
"Thank God for Kids" (Eddy Raven)
"Silent Night"
"Little One"
"Mary Christmas"
"Oh Holy Night"

Personnel

Group members
Joe Bonsall
Duane Allen
Richard Sterban
William Lee Golden

Other musicians
 Jimmy Capps - acoustic guitar
 Gene Chrisman - drums
 Ferrell Morris - percussion
 Steve Nathan - keyboards
 Ron Oates - keyboards
 Cindy Reynolds - harp
 Billy Sanford - acoustic guitar, electric guitar
 Jack Williams - bass guitar
 Reggie Young - electric guitar

Backing vocals
 Dee Allen
 Jamie Allen
 Monica Boulanger
 Jamie Burris
 Melissa Burris
 Julie Horne
 Desiree Ladd
 Teri Martin
 Dale Miller
 Mindy Miller
 Robbie Mitchell
 Ginger Morgan
 Christopher Sterban
 Tara Slate
 Ginna Tarbutton

Horns
 Billy Puett
 Bobby Taylor
 Don Sheffield
 George Tidwell
 Rex Peer
 Roger Bissell

Strings
 George Binkley III
 John David Boyle
 Marvin D. Chantry
 Roy Christensen
 Virginia Christensen
 Margaret Estill
 Lawrence Evans Harvin
 Pauli Ewing
 Daniel Furth
 Carl Gorodetzky
 Lennie Haight
 Phyllis E. Hiltz
 Rebecca Lynch
 Dennis W. Malchan
 Craig Nelson
 Walter Schwede
 Harris Shilakowsky
 Garry Vanosdale
 Pamela Vanosdale

Chart performance

Album

Singles

References 

The Oak Ridge Boys albums
1982 Christmas albums
Christmas albums by American artists
MCA Records albums
Albums produced by Ron Chancey
Country Christmas albums